William Charles "Jack" Davis (born 1946) is an American historian who was a professor of history at Virginia Tech and the former director of programs at that school's Virginia Center for Civil War Studies. Specializing in the American Civil War, Davis has written more than 40 books on that subject and other aspects of early southern U.S. history, such as the Texas Revolution. He is the only three-time winner of the Jefferson Davis Prize for Confederate history and was awarded the Jules and Frances Landry Award for Southern History. His book Lone Star Rising has been called "the best one-volume history of the Texas revolution yet written".

Life and career

Early life and education
Davis earned Bachelor of Arts and Master of Arts (History, 1969) degrees from Sonoma State University. For many years, he was editor and publisher of Civil War Times Illustrated and lived in Mechanicsburg, Pennsylvania.

Career
Davis's expertise on Confederate and Southern U.S. history has made him a valued consultant for newspaper articles as well as television productions, including the Arts & Entertainment Network/History Channel series Civil War Journal.

Davis served as a consultant for the creation of a United States postage stamp of Jefferson Davis and has had input into the formation of the Museum of the Civil War in Petersburg, Virginia.

1990s
Davis was awarded the Sonoma State University Distinguished Alumni Award in 1993. In 2015, he received The Lincoln Forum's Richard Nelson Current Award of Achievement.
He is a past president of the National Historical Society.

In 1996, Davis authored the book The Cause Lost: Myths and Realities of the Confederacy, a critical examination of mythical claims made by neo-Confederates and Lost Cause members regarding the Confederacy and the American Civil War. Davis states that "it is impossible to point to any other local issue but slavery and say that Southerners would have seceded and fought over it." However, Davis contrasted the motivations of the Confederate leadership with that of the motivations for individual men for fighting in the Confederate army, writing that "The widespread northern myth that the Confederates went to the battlefield to perpetuate slavery is just that, a myth. Their letters and diaries, in the tens of thousands, reveal again and again that they fought and died because their Southern homeland was invaded and their natural instinct was to protect home and hearth."

2000s
In 2000, Davis became a professor at Virginia Tech, where he served as director of programs for the Virginia Center for Civil War Studies. He retired from this position in 2013.

Works

Original works
Breckinridge: Statesman, Soldier, Symbol (1974)
Duel Between the First Ironclads: The Famous Civil War Battle at Sea Between the Union Ironclad Monitor and the Confederacy's Virginia, the Redesigned and Rebuilt U.S.S. Merrimack  (1975; 2nd ed. 1994)
The Battle of New Market (1975, 2nd ed. 1993)
Battle at Bull Run: A History of the First Major Campaign of the Civil War (1977, 2nd ed. 1995)
The Orphan Brigade: The Kentucky Confederates Who Couldn’t Go Home (1980; 2nd ed. 1993)
The Imperiled Union, 1861-1865 (2 volumes)
Deep Waters of the Proud (1982)
Stand in the Day of Battle (1983)
Brother Against Brother - The War Begins (1983), Time-Life Series: The Civil War
First Blood: Fort Sumter to Bull Run (1983), Time-Life Series: The Civil War
Death in the Trenches: Grant at Petersburg (1986), Time-Life Series: The Civil War
Rebels & Yankees: The Battlefields of the Civil War (19??) with Russ A. Pritchard
Rebels & Yankees: The Fighting Men of the Civil War (1989) with Russ A. Pritchard
Rebels & Yankees: The Commanders of the Civil War (1990) with Russ A. Pritchard
Jefferson Davis: The Man and His Hour (1991)
 'A Government of Our Own': The Making of the Confederacy (1994)
The American Frontier: Pioneers, Settlers, and Cowboys 1800-1899 (1995)
A Way Through the Wilderness: The Natchez Trace and the Civilization of the Southern Frontier (1995)
The Cause Lost: Myths and Realities of the Confederacy (1996)
Three Roads to the Alamo: The Lives and Fortunes of David Crockett, James Bowie, and William Barret Travis (1998)
Lincoln's Men: How President Lincoln Became Father to an Army and a Nation (1999)
The Union That Shaped the Confederacy: Robert Toombs and Alexander H. Stephens (2001)
Portraits of the Riverboats (2001)
An Honorable Defeat: The Last Days of the Confederate Government (2001)
The Civil War Reenactors' Encyclopedia (2002)
Look Away! A History of the Confederate States of America (2003)
A Taste For War: The Culinary History of the Blue and the Gray (2003)
Lone Star Rising: The Revolutionary Birth of the Texas Republic (2004)
The Pirates Laffite: The Treacherous World of the Corsairs of the Gulf (2005)
The Rogue Republic: How Would-Be Patriots Waged the Shortest Revolution in American History (2011)
Crucible of Command: Ulysses S. Grant and Robert E. Lee—The War They Fought, the Peace They Forged (2015)
The Greatest Fury: The Battle of New Orleans and the Rebirth of America (2019)

Editor or co-editor
The Image of War: 1861-1865; National Historical Society: Doubleday & Company, Inc.
Volume I: Shadows of the Storm (1981)
Volume II: The Guns of '62 (1982)
Volume III: The Embattled Confederacy (1982)
Volume IV: Fighting for Time (1983)
Volume V: The South Besieged (1983)
Volume VI: The End of an Era (1984)
Touched by Fire: A National Historical Society Photographic Portrait of the Civil War (1985; 2 volumes)
Diary of a Confederate Soldier: John S. Jackman of the Orphan Brigade (1990)
Civil War Journal: The Battles (1998) with Brian C. Pohanka and Don Troiani
Civil War Journal: The Legacies (1999) with Brian C. Pohanka and Don Troiani
A Fire-Eater Remembers: The Confederate Memoir of Robert Barnwell Rhett (2000)
Civil War Journal: The Leaders (2003) with Brian C. Pohanka and Don Troiani
Faith in the Fight: Civil War Chaplains (2003) with John W. Brinsfield and Benedict Maryniak
Virginia at War, 1861 (2005) with James I. Robertson, Jr.
Virginia at War, 1862 (2008) with James I. Robertson, Jr.
Virginia at War, 1863 (2008) with James I. Robertson, Jr.
Virginia at War, 1864 (2009) with James I. Robertson, Jr.
Virginia at War, 1865 (2011) with James I. Robertson, Jr.

Foreword
Troiani, Don and Brian Pohanka (1999), Don Troiani's Civil War
Meade, Robert Douthat (2001), Judah P. Benjamin: Confederate Statesman
Lowry, Thomas P. (1998), Tarnished Eagles
Kunstler, Mort (2007), The Civil War Paintings of Mort Kunstler, Volume 3: The Gettysburg Campaign
Lowry, Thomas P. (2003), Curmudgeons, Drunkards, and Outright Fools: The Courts-Martial of Civil War Union Colonels
McCoy, Sharolyn S (2013), ''Big Mountain to Washburn Prairie, The Sugar Creek Hills of Southwest M

References

External links

21st-century American historians
American male non-fiction writers
Historians of the Texas Revolution
Virginia Tech faculty
Living people
1946 births
21st-century American male writers